Salo railway station is located in the town of Salo in the Southwest Finland region, Finland. All passenger trains between Helsinki and Turku stop at Salo, and the station also serves cargo traffic. About 320 thousand passengers use the station every year. Inside the station, there is one automatic ticket vending machine. The station has three elevated platforms for passenger traffic, and for going underneath the tracks, there is a tunnel, with exits by stairs and elevator.

The Salo railway station was built in 1898 according to a design by Bruno Granholm, and has been preserved in the same form.

The Salo railway station was the VR Group's Station of the Year in 2005. The choice of Salo as the winner was based on increased sales (9% improvement over last year), quality of customer service, and cleanliness of the station.

The distance east to the Ervelä cargo station is 25 kilometres and west to the Paimio cargo station is 29 kilometres. The distance to Turku is 56 kilometres and the distance to Helsinki is 144 kilometres.

See also 
 Railway lines in Finland

References

External links 
 

Railway stations in Southwest Finland
Railway stations designed by Bruno Granholm
Railway stations opened in 1898